Sarcohyla charadricola is a species of frogs in the family Hylidae.

It is endemic to Mexico.
Its natural habitats are subtropical or tropical moist montane forests and rivers.
It is threatened by habitat loss.

Sources

Amphibians described in 1964
Taxonomy articles created by Polbot
charadricola